Pari Hoon Main [Translation: I am a Fairy] is an Indian television series which premiered on 28 January 2008 on STAR One featuring Rashami Desai, Mohit Malik and Karan Veer Mehra in the lead roles.

Plot
The story revolves around an ordinary girl named Nikki who lives with her aggressive uncle and aunt. Nikki bumps into the house of a famous film actress Pari, her doppelganger whose family is unaware of the incident. Nikki goes through the chaotic phenomenon soon after replacing the film star and lives under latter's image. Pari's boyfriend Rajveer (Mohit Malik) who's also a superstar, falls in love with Nikki, meanwhile the real Pari is comatose after an accident. Nikki who also falls for Rajveer, manages to carry on with her complicated lifestyle until Pari recovers consciousness and attempts reaching out to her family.

Cast
 Rashami Desai as Nikki Shrivastav and Pari Rai Choudhary (look-alikes)
 Mohit Malik as Rajveer Kapoor 
 Karan Veer Mehra as Karan
 Upasana Singh as Nikki's Mami
 Adi Irani as Nikki's Mama 
 Jhumma Mitra as Sarita (Nikki's best friend)

References

Star One (Indian TV channel) original programming
Indian drama television series
2008 Indian television series debuts
2008 Indian television series endings